"Angels on the Moon" is a song written by Scott Jason and Clayton Stroope and recorded by their band, Thriving Ivory. It was released in March 2008 as the lead single from the re-release of the group's self-titled album, released on Wind-Up Records. The song was used on the debut of VH1's Scream Queens. It was originally recorded in 2002 for their self-titled album.

Content
The song was inspired by the September 11 attacks and there are many references to the city of New York in the song. Songwriter and keyboardist Scott Jason told Songfacts that "Angels on the Moon" was also inspired by the U2 song "Where The Streets Have No Name".

Music video
The video begins with the band performing at various part of San Francisco while getting faded and some scenes performing together in an alley and it ends with lead singer Clayton Stroope walking and singing. The video was released on June 2, 2008 and was directed by Christopher Sims.

Charts and sales

Peak positions

Certifications

References

2003 songs
2008 debut singles
Music about the September 11 attacks
Wind-up Records singles
Song recordings produced by Howard Benson